The Government Film & Television Institute, Bangalore (formerly a part of S.J.Polytechnic) is believed as the first government institute in India to start technical courses related to films. It is one of the few government film institutes in India. The institute is located at Hesaraghatta, Bengaluru in Karnataka. It comes under the Directorate of Technical Education, Government of Karnataka.
The institute offers three-year diploma courses in Cinematography and Sound Recording and Engineering. The diploma certificates are awarded by the Department of Technical Education, Government of Karnataka.

History
M. Visvesvaraya founded the Sri Jayachamarajendra Occupational Institute in August 1945 in Bengaluru, named after the Maharaja of Mysore. It aimed to provide trained technicians to the industries that were then developing rapidly. It offered training in engineering and crafts subjects including ceramics, instrument technology, boilers and engines, welding and metalwork, cinematography, sound and radio engineering. It was the first educational institution of its kind in India.

In September 1996 the courses in cinematography and sound & television were transferred to the newly opened Government Film & Television Institute in Hesaraghatta under the World Bank Assisted Project for Technician Development in India.

Location 
The Institute is situated in Hesaraghatta about 30 km from the city and covers 25 acres.

Courses 
Government Film & Television Institute offers two 3 year Diploma courses in Cinematography and Sound Recording & Engg. The intake of students for each course is 33for cinematography and 17 for Sound Recording .

Cinematography
The 3-year study in Cinematography covers Still Photography, Motion Picture Photography and Videography with subjects like Film Analysis & Appreciation, Visual Composition, Filming Techniques,
Lighting Techniques, Film Processing, Film Projection, Electronic Cinematography, Television Production, Multimedia, Computer Graphics & Animation.

The Cinematography department has two Still Photography Studios, Motion Picture Labs, Television Production Floor and an acoustically treated Film Shooting Floor with a viewers gallery.

Eligibility 
Karnataka SSLC or Equivalent

Lateral entry : 10+2 or Karnataka II PUC with PCM or Equivalent

Sound Engineering
The Sound Recording & Engineering course covers recording techniques, architectural acoustics, digital recording, music, analog and digital electronics, communication engineering and television engineering.

The Sound Recording department has a studio which can be used for recording music, voice dubbing, background scoring in analog and digital formats. It has a digital audio workstation, video post-production console, film projection booth, electronics lab and computer Lab.

Eligibility'''
Karnataka SSLC or Equivalent

Lateral entry : 10+2 or Karnataka II PUC with PCM or Equivalent

Notable alumni 
 V. K. Murthy
  Ashok Kashyap
 Gireesh Gangadharan
 Govind Nihalani
 Jomon T. John
 Master Manjunath
 Santosh Rai Pathaje
 Satya Hegde
 Shekhar Chandru
 S. Krishna
 Rajmohan Saviram
 Rishabh Shetty

See also 
 Cinema of India
 Film and Television Institute of India
 List of film schools
 K. R. Narayanan National Institute of Visual Science and Arts

References

External links
 

Film schools in India
Universities and colleges in Bangalore
Educational institutions established in 1943
1943 establishments in India
State agencies of Karnataka